The Duffin–Schaeffer conjecture was a conjecture (now a theorem) in mathematics, specifically, the  Diophantine approximation proposed by R. J. Duffin and A. C. Schaeffer in 1941. It states that if  is a real-valued function taking on positive values, then for almost all  (with respect to Lebesgue measure), the inequality

 

has infinitely many solutions in coprime integers  with  if and only if

 

where  is Euler's totient function. 

In 2019, the Duffin–Schaeffer conjecture was proved by Dimitris Koukoulopoulos and James Maynard.

Progress
That existence of the rational approximations implies divergence of the series follows from the Borel–Cantelli lemma.  The converse implication is the crux of the conjecture.
There have been many partial results of the Duffin–Schaeffer conjecture established to date. This was strengthened by Jeffrey Vaaler in 1978 to the case . More recently, this was strengthened to the conjecture being true whenever there exists some  such that the series
. This was done by Haynes, Pollington, and Velani.

In 2006, Beresnevich and Velani proved that a Hausdorff measure analogue of the Duffin–Schaeffer conjecture is equivalent to the original Duffin–Schaeffer conjecture, which is a priori weaker. This result was published in the Annals of Mathematics.

In July 2019, Dimitris Koukoulopoulos and James Maynard announced a proof of the conjecture. In July 2020, the proof was published in the Annals of Mathematics.

Related problems

A higher-dimensional analogue of this conjecture was resolved by Vaughan and Pollington in 1990.

See also 

 Khinchin's theorem

Notes

References

External links 

 Quanta magazine article about Duffin-Schaeffer conjecture.
Numberphile interview with James Maynard about the proof.

Conjectures
Conjectures that have been proved
Diophantine approximation